Littoral Croatia may refer to:

 Duchy of Littoral Croatia
 Littoral parts of modern-day Croatia, namely Dalmatia and the Croatian Littoral

See also
 Croatia (disambiguation)